The Hatter is a fictional character in Lewis Carroll's 1865 book Alice's Adventures in Wonderland and its 1871 sequel Through the Looking-Glass. He is very often referred to as the Mad Hatter, though this term was never used by Carroll. The phrase "mad as a hatter" pre-dates Carroll's works. The Hatter and the March Hare are referred to as "both mad" by the Cheshire Cat, in Alice's Adventures in Wonderland in the sixth chapter titled "Pig and Pepper".

Fictional character biography

Alice's Adventures in Wonderland
The Hatter character, alongside all the other fictional beings, first appears in Lewis Carroll's 1865 novel Alice's Adventures in Wonderland. In "Chapter Seven – A Mad Tea-Party", while exploring Wonderland, Alice comes across the Hatter having tea with the March Hare and the Dormouse. The Hatter explains to Alice that they are always having tea because when he tried to sing for the foul-tempered Queen of Hearts, she sentenced him to death for "murdering the time", but he escapes decapitation. In retaliation, Time (referred to as "he" by the Hatter) halts himself in respect to the Hatter, keeping him stuck at 6:00 pm (or 18:00) forever.

When Alice arrives at the tea party, the Hatter is characterised by switching places on the table at any given time, making short, personal remarks, asking unanswerable riddles, and reciting nonsensical poetry, all of which eventually drives Alice away. The Hatter appears again in "Chapter Eleven – Who Stole the Tarts?", as a witness at the Knave of Hearts' trial, where the Queen appears to recognise him as the singer she sentenced to death, and the King of Hearts also cautions him not to be nervous or he will have him "executed on the spot".

Through the Looking-Glass
The character also appears briefly in Carroll's 1871 Through the Looking-Glass, the sequel to Alice's Adventures in Wonderland. Under the name of "Hatta," the Hatter was in trouble with the law once again. He was, however, not necessarily guilty, as the White Queen explained that subjects were often punished before they commit a crime, rather than after, and sometimes they did not even commit one at all. He was also mentioned as one of the White King's messengers along with March Hare, who went under the name of "Haigha." Sir John Tenniel's illustration depicts Hatta as sipping from a teacup as he did in the original novel. Alice does not comment on whether Hatta is the Hatter of her earlier dream.

Characterization

Etymology
Mercury was used in the manufacturing of felt hats during the 19th century, causing a high rate of mercury poisoning among those working in the hat industry. Mercury poisoning causes neurological damage, including slurred speech, memory loss, and tremors, which led to the phrase "mad as a hatter". In the Victorian age, many workers in the textile industry, including hatters, sometimes developed illnesses affecting the nervous system, such as central nervous system (CNS) tuberculosis, which is portrayed in novels like Alton Locke by Charles Kingsley and North and South by Elizabeth Gaskell, which Lewis Carroll had read. Many such workers were sent to Pauper Lunatic Asylums, which were supervised by Lunacy Commissioners such as Samuel Gaskell and Robert Wilfred Skeffington Lutwidge, Carroll's uncle. Carroll was familiar with the conditions at asylums and visited at least one, the Surrey County Asylum, himself, which treated patients with so-called non-restraint methods and occupied them, amongst others, in gardening, farming and hat-making. Besides staging theatre plays, dances and other amusements, such asylums also held tea-parties.

Appearance
Although, during the trial of the Knave of Hearts, the King of Hearts remarks upon the Hatter's headgear, Carroll does not describe the exact style of hat he wears.  The character's signature top hat comes from John Tenniel's illustrations for the first edition, in which the character wears a large top hat with a hatband reading "In this style 10/6". This is further elaborated on in The Nursery "Alice", a shortened version of Alice's Adventures in Wonderland, adapted by the author himself for young children. Here it is stated that the character is wearing a hat on his head with a price tag containing the numbers 10 and 6, giving the price in pre-decimal British money as ten shillings and six pence (or half a guinea).

Personality

The Hatter and his tea party friend, the March Hare, are initially referred to as "both mad" by the distinctive Cheshire Cat. The first mention of both characters occurs in the sixth chapter of Carroll's Alice's Adventures in Wonderland, titled "Pig and Pepper", in a conversation between the child protagonist Alice and the Cheshire Cat, when she asks "what sort of people live about here?" to which the cat replies "in that direction lives a Hatter, and in that direction, lives a March Hare. Visit either you like: they're both mad!" Both then subsequently make their actual debuts in the seventh chapter of the same book, which is titled "A Mad Tea-Party".

Hat making was the main trade in Stockport where Carroll grew up, and it was not unusual then for hatters to appear disturbed or confused; many died early as a result of mercury poisoning. However, the Hatter does not exhibit the symptoms of mercury poisoning, which include excessive timidity, diffidence, increasing shyness, loss of self-confidence, anxiety, and a desire to remain unobserved and unobtrusive.

Resemblance to Theophilus Carter
It has often been claimed that the Hatter's character may have been inspired by Theophilus Carter, an eccentric furniture dealer. Carter was supposedly at one time a servitor at Christ Church, one of the University of Oxford's colleges. This is not substantiated by university records. He later owned a furniture shop, and became known as the "Mad Hatter" from his habit of standing in the door of his shop wearing a top hat. Sir John Tenniel is reported to have come to Oxford especially to sketch him for his illustrations. There is no evidence for this claim, however, in either Carroll's letters or diaries.

Riddle
In the chapter "A Mad Tea Party", the Hatter asks a much-noted riddle: "Why is a raven like a writing desk?" When Alice gives up trying to figure out why, the Hatter admits "I haven't the slightest idea!". Carroll originally intended the riddle to be without an answer, but after many requests from readers, he and others—including puzzle expert Sam Loyd—suggested possible answers; in his preface to the 1896 edition of Alice's Adventures in Wonderland, Carroll wrote:

Loyd proposed a number of alternative solutions to the riddle, including "because Poe wrote on both" (alluding to Poe's 1845 narrative poem The Raven) and "because the notes for which they are noted are not noted for being musical notes". The April 2017 edition of Bandersnatch, the Newsletter of the Lewis Carroll Society [Issue 172, Apr 2017], published the following solution, proposed by puzzle expert Rick Hosburn: "Why is a Raven like a Writing-desk?" "Because one is a crow with a bill, while the other is a bureau with a quill!" The RSPB, in its definition of Raven, states: "The raven [...] is all black with a large bill, and long wings." American author Stephen King provides an alternative answer to the Hatter's riddle in his 1977 horror novel The Shining. Snowbound and isolated "ten thousand feet high" in the Rocky Mountains, five-year-old Danny hears whispers of the malign "voice of the [Overlook] hotel" inside his head, including this bit of mockery: "Why is a raven like a writing desk? The higher the fewer, of course! Have another cup of tea!"

In popular culture
The Hatter has been featured in nearly every adaptation of Alice in Wonderland to date; he is usually the male lead despite being a supporting character.  The character has been portrayed in film by Norman Whitten, Edward Everett Horton, Sir Robert Helpmann, Martin Short, Peter Cook, Anthony Newley, Ed Wynn, Andrew-Lee Potts, and Johnny Depp. In music videos, the Hatter has been portrayed by Tom Petty, Dero Goi, and Steven Tyler. He has also been portrayed on stage by Nikki Snelson and Katherine Shindle, and on television by John Robert Hoffman, Pip Donaghy and Sebastian Stan. In ballet adaptations, Steven McRae also portrayed him as a mad 'Tapper'. In March 2019, Chelsy Meiss became the first female soloist to play the Mad Hatter for the National Ballet of Canada.

Films

 In the 1951 Walt Disney animated feature Alice in Wonderland, the Hatter, referred to by others as "The Mad Hatter", appears as a short, hyperactive man with grey hair, a large nose and a comical voice. He was voiced by Ed Wynn in 1951, and by Corey Burton in his later appearances (Bonkers, House of Mouse). Alice stumbles upon the Hatter and the March Hare having an "un-birthday" party for themselves. The Hatter asks her the infamous riddle "why is a raven like a writing desk?", but when she tries to answer the Hatter and the March Hare think she is "stark raving mad" and the Hatter completely forgot that he even asked her the riddle. Throughout the course of the film, the Hatter pulls numerous items out of his hat, such as cake and smaller hats. His personality is that of a child; angry one second, happy the next.
 The Hatter appears in Tim Burton's 2010 version of Alice in Wonderland portrayed by Johnny Depp and given the name Tarrant Hightopp. In the film, the Hatter takes Alice toward the White Queen's castle and relates the terror of the Red Queen's reign while commenting that Alice is not the same as she once was. The Hatter subsequently helps Alice avoid capture by the Red Queen's guards by allowing himself to be seized instead. He is later saved from execution by the Cheshire Cat and calls for rebellion against the Red Queen. Near the end of the film, the Hatter unsuccessfully suggests to Alice that she could stay in Wonderland and consummate his feelings for her.Critical reception to Johnny Depp's portrayal of the Hatter was generally positive. David Edelstein of New York Magazine remarked that while the elements of the character suggested by Depp don't entirely come together, "Depp brings an infectious summer-stock zest to everything he does." Bill Goodykoontz of The Arizona Republic said that "Depp is exactly what you'd expect, which is a good thing. Gap-toothed and leering, at times he looks like Madonna after sticking a fork in a toaster. How he finds his characters is anybody's guess, a sort of thrift-store warehouse of eccentricities, it seems like. But it works." Owen Gleiberman of Entertainment Weekly had a more mixed opinion and commented that Depp as the Hatter is "a fantastic image, but once Depp opens his mouth, what comes out is a noisome Scottish brogue that makes everything he says sound more or less the same. The character offers no captivatingly skewed bat-house psychology. There isn't much to him, really—he's just a smiling Johnny one-note with a secret hip-hop dance move—and so we start to react to him the way that Alice does to everything else: by wondering when he's going to stop making nonsense." Kenneth Turan of Los Angeles Times stated that "there's no denying Depp's gifts and abilities, but this performance feels both indulgent and something we've all seen before."
 The Hatter is played by Clarke Peters in the 2020 movie Come Away. He is depicted as the father of Captain Hook, the grandfather of Alice and Peter Pan, and the great-grandfather of Wendy Darling, John Darling, and Michael Darling.

Television
 The Hatter was also a semi-regular on the Disney Afternoon series Bonkers and one of the guests in House of Mouse, where he even made a cameo appearance in one of the featured cartoon shorts.
 The TV series Futurama has a robot named Mad Hatterbot who is based on the Hatter. Seen only in the HAL Institute (an asylum for criminally insane robots) the Mad Hatterbot only says one line: "Change places!", which all in the room comply with when spoken. The price tag on his hat reads "5/3", exactly half of 10/6. A minor character, he has been in the episodes "Insane in the Mainframe" and "Follow the Reader" as well as the film Futurama: Bender's Game.
 In Syfy's Alice, the Hatter (Andrew-Lee Potts) is portrayed as a smuggler who starts off working as a double agent for the Queen of Hearts and the Wonderland Resistance in the story; over the course of the story, he begins to side more and more with the Resistance, and ends up falling in love with Alice as he helps her along the way.
 In Once Upon a Time, the Mad Hatter is presented as possessing the unique ability to cross dimensions through his hat, and has a daughter, Grace, who lost her mother Priscilla as a result of a past deal with the Evil Queen. When the Queen offers him enough wealth to set his daughter up for life, he agrees to help her travel to Wonderland, but when it is revealed that the goal was for the Queen to retrieve her captured father, the Hatter is left trapped in Wonderland instead, as the portal will only allow two people to pass through it in either direction. Trapped in Wonderland, he was then driven mad as he attempted to find another way back to his world to reunite with his daughter. In the first season, trapped in the Land Without Magic, the Mad Hatter- now known as 'Jefferson' as he lives in a mansion just on the outskirts of Storeybrooke- is one of the few who remembers his original life due to his insanity. His daughter has also been brought into Storeybrooke, but he has avoided making contact with her due to her new memories meaning that she would not recognise him. Unable to harness magic in this world, he attempts to recruit Emma to make a hat for him, but she is unable to harness her power, although Jefferson's knowledge of the curse gives Emma further proof that Henry is telling the truth. Regina later recruits Jefferson to help her create a curse to use on Emma, but Regina's efforts backfire and give Emma clear proof that the curse is real. In the second season, with the curse broken, Jefferson is eventually convinced to reunite with his daughter.
 In the Netflix's Ever After High episode "Spring Unsprung", the Mad Hatter makes an appearance as Madeline Hatter's father. In the 47-minute special, he runs the Mad Hatter's Tea Shoppe in the town of Bookend, not far from Maddie's school Ever After High. He also runs a shop by the same name in Wonderland, but it was abandoned after the Evil Queen (Raven Queen's mother) cast a curse upon the land.

Video games
 In the 2000 video game American McGee's Alice, The Mad Hatter is portrayed as psychotic, literally gone "mad" and obsessed with time and clockworks, and considers himself to be a genius. He invents mechanical devices, often evidently using the bodies of living organisms for the base of his inventions, as he plans to do to all of Wonderland's inhabitants. He appears in the 2011 sequel Alice: Madness Returns in the same appearance, although this time, he requests Alice's help in retrieving his lost limbs from his former compatriots the March Hare and Dormouse. The Hatter's fixation on time might be based on the unseen character Time, which might explain why he replaced his body with cogs and gears as he sees Time as some type of god.
 The Hatter makes a cameo appearance in a painting in the Tea Party Garden in the 2002 video game Kingdom Hearts.
 The Mad Hatter appeared in the Sunsoft's 2006 mobile game . The Mad Hatter is portrayed as a middle-school age boy in oversized clothes and a large hat that covers his whole head. Unlike most Wonderland residents, he acts rather bratty and rude to Ariko (the "Alice" of the game). In one of the bad endings, Mad Hatter is killed by a twisted Cheshire Cat.
 In Get Even, one of the asylum patients wearing the Pandora headsets dresses as the Hatter and has a tea party in his cell, he gives Cole Black a riddle to get the door open, there is a choice option to leave him in his room or set him free to which he'll join the other inmates to kill Black, who they all believe is the "Puppet Master".

Music
 The song "Mad Hatter" by an American garage rock band Shag was inspired by the character. It appeared on their self-titled album in 1969.
 Sir John Tenniel's drawing of the Hatter, combined with a montage of other images from Alice in Wonderland, were used as a logo by Charisma Records from 1972 onwards.
 A Burton's inspired Mad Hatter appears in "The Man who became a Rabbit" music video, an Indian version of Alice in Wonderland by Valérian MacRabbit and Lalkrishnan. Mad Hatter becomes Mac Hatter and gives one riddle to the main character : "Spread blood on the birthday cake".
The Mad Hatter’s name is used in Elton John’s 1972 song Mona Lisas and Mad Hatters.
The Mad Hatter is referenced to in the eponymous 2015 song by Melanie Martinez, next to a few other characters from Carroll's Alice in Wonderland.

Live performance
 The Hatter is a greetable character at the Disneyland Resort, Walt Disney World Resort, Tokyo Disney Resort, Disneyland Paris Resort and Hong Kong Disneyland.
 Shrek The Musical, the Mad Hatter plays a small role as a fairytale creature (replacing the Gnome) and has two lines in songs including "They ridiculed my hat" and "I smell like sauerkraut".
 Frank Wildhorn composed the music to and co-wrote the music to Wonderland: A New Alice. In this adaption the Hatter is portrayed as a female, the villain of the story, and Alice's alter-ego and is a mad woman who longs to be Queen. She was played by Nikki Snelson in the original Tampa, Florida production, and then by Kate Shindle in the Tampa/Houston Tour, and the production on Broadway.

Comic strips and books
 The Mad Hatter (also referred to as "Jervis Tetch") is a supervillain and enemy of the Batman in DC comic books, making his first appearance in the October 1948 (#49) release of Batman. He is portrayed as a brilliant neurotechnician with considerable knowledge in how to dominate and control the human mind. Jervis had a obsession over Lewis Carroll's books that he believes himself to be the reincarnation of the Mad Hatter, including making his henchmen wear outfits based on the Wonderland characters and kidnapping women and force them to dress and named them Alice.
 A spin-off of the traditional Alice in Wonderland story, Frank Beddor's The Looking Glass Wars features a character named Hatter Madigan, a member of an elite group of bodyguards known in Wonderland as the "Millinery" after the business of selling women's hats. He acts as the bodyguard of the rightful Queen, and as guide/guardian to the protagonist, Alyss Heart.
 The Mad Hatter in Pandora Hearts manga series is a chain (creature from the Abyss) that was contracted by Xerxes Break. The hatter basically looks like a large top hat with flowery decorations (similar to Break's top hat) and a tattered cape. When summoned, it can destroy all chains and objects from the Abyss within a large area.
 The Japanese manga Alice in the Country of Hearts has been translated into English. The Hatter role is played by Blood Dupre, a crime boss and leader of a street gang called The Hatters, which controls one of the four territories of Wonderland.

Toys
The Hatter has a daughter named Madeline in Ever After High toy line.

See also
 March Hare
 Dormouse

Notes

References

Sources

External links

 

Literary characters introduced in 1865
Milliners
Male characters in film
Male characters in literature
Male characters in television
Lewis Carroll characters
Charisma Records